Malaya Shelkovka is a rural locality (a selo) and the administrative center of Maloshelkovnikovsky Selsoviet, Yegoryevsky District, Altai Krai, Russia. The population was 708 as of 2013. There are 7 streets.

Geography 
Malaya Shelkovka is located 33 km south of Novoyegoryevskoye (the district's administrative centre) by road. Borisovka is the nearest rural locality.

References 

Rural localities in Yegoryevsky District, Altai Krai